United to End Racism (UER) is an ongoing program of the Re-evaluation Counseling Communities (RC), whose publicly stated aims are "dedicated to eliminating racism in the world" and "to illuminate the damage done to individuals by racism and to undo this damage on an individual basis, using the resources and process of Re-evaluation Counseling."

UER was founded by RC on 28 November 2000. Since then, it has attended international NGO conferences such as the 2001 Durban World Conference against Racism and more recently the World Social Forum in Caracas, the World Peace Forum 2006 in Vancouver (where the organisation labelled itself "Healing from War, Working for Peace") and the White Privilege Conference 2006 in Pella, Iowa. Barbara Love, the RC "International Liberation Reference Person for People of African Heritage", was a keynote speaker at this conference. A delegation from UER attended the United States Social Forum (USSF) in 2007 and the fifth European Social Forum in Malmo, Sweden, in 2008.

In addition to sending representatives to activist conferences, individual members of RC sometimes present small "UER" events or workshops, often in association with other anti-racism efforts in their local area.

United to End Racism is one of a number of non-profit organizations that represent RC in public forums. Harvey Jackins, founder of the RC movement, encouraged members of RC to create such organizations to spread RC ideas and objectives along lines decided by the RC leadership; previous well known examples of this tactic include Nuclear Freeze campaigns in the 1980s and the US-based National Coalition Building Institute, founded by RC'er Cherie Brown. Jackins' son, Tim Jackins, the current world leader of RC, is also the de facto leader of UER. The organisation appears solely to exist to service activist conferences as an invited body, and only sporadically carries out other activities. It has no separate membership from RC and is managed from Personal Counselors, Inc (recently renamed "Re-evaluation Counseling Community Resources, Inc"), the office of RC in Seattle. Officers of UER are members of Re-evaluation Counseling and UER policies are determined by the RC leadership.

References

External links 
 United To End Racism Home Page on the RC Website (archived on Feb 18 2007)
 Current UER Home Page (Jun 2021)

Anti-racist organizations in the United States
Counseling organizations
Front organizations